The 1922 Washington & Jefferson Presidents football team was an American football team that represented Washington & Jefferson College as an independent during the 1922 college football season. The team compiled a 6–3–1 record. Greasy Neale was the head coach for the second year.

Schedule

References

Washington and Jefferson
Washington & Jefferson Presidents football seasons
Washington and Jefferson Presidents football